Juan Martín Maldacena (born 10 September 1968) is an Argentine theoretical physicist and the Carl P. Feinberg Professor in the School of Natural Sciences at the Institute for Advanced Study, Princeton. He has made significant contributions to the foundations of string theory and quantum gravity. His most famous discovery is the AdS/CFT correspondence, a realization of the holographic principle in string theory.

Biography
Maldacena obtained his licenciatura (a six-year degree) in 1991 at the Instituto Balseiro, Bariloche, Argentina, under the supervision of Gerardo Aldazábal. He then obtained his Ph.D. in physics at Princeton University after completing a doctoral dissertation titled "Black holes in string theory" under the supervision of Curtis Callan in 1996, and went on to a post-doctoral position at Rutgers University. In 1997, he joined Harvard University as associate professor, being quickly promoted to Professor of Physics in 1999. Since 2001 he has been a professor at the Institute for Advanced Study in Princeton, New Jersey and in 2016 became the first Carl P. Feinberg Professor of Theoretical Physics in the institute's School of Natural Sciences.

Contributions to physics 
Maldacena has made numerous discoveries in theoretical physics. Leonard Susskind called him "perhaps the greatest physicist of his generation... certainly the greatest theoretical physicist of his generation". His most famous discovery is the most reliable realization of the holographic principle – namely the AdS/CFT correspondence, a conjecture about the equivalence of string theory on Anti-de Sitter (AdS) space, and a conformal field theory defined on the boundary of the AdS space. According to the conjecture, certain theories of quantum gravity are equivalent to other quantum mechanical theories (with no gravitational force) in one fewer spacetime dimensions.

In subsequent works, Maldacena elucidated several aspects of the AdS/CFT correspondence, describing how certain physical observables defined in one theory can be described in the equivalent theory. Shortly after his original work on the AdS/CFT correspondence, Maldacena showed how Wilson lines can be computed in a corresponding string theory by considering the area swept by an evolving fundamental string. Wilson lines are non-local physical observables defined in gauge theory. In 2001, Maldacena proposed that an eternal black hole, an object defined in a gravitational theory, is equivalent to a certain entangled state involving two copies of the corresponding quantum mechanical theory. Ordinary black holes emit Hawking radiation and eventually evaporate. An eternal black hole is a type of black hole that survives forever because it eventually re-absorbs the radiation it emits.

In 2013, Maldacena co-authored an analysis of the 2012 black hole firewall paradox with Leonard Susskind, arguing that the paradox can be resolved if entangled particles are connected by minor wormholes."

Publications

Awards
Maldacena has received these awards:

 Alfred P. Sloan Foundation Fellowship, 1998
 Packard Fellowship in Science and Engineering, 1998
 MacArthur Fellowship, 1999
 UNESCO Husein Prize for Young Scientists, 1999
 Sackler Prize in Physics, 2000
 Xanthopoulos International Award for Research in Gravitational Physics, 2001
 Pius XI Medal, 2002
 Edward A. Bouchet Award of the American Physical Society, 2004
Member of the American Academy of Arts and Sciences, elected 2007
Member of the National Academy of Sciences, elected 2013
 Dannie Heineman Prize, 2007
 Dirac Medal of the ITCP, 2008
 Pomeranchuk Prize, 2012
 Fundamental Physics Prize, 2012.
 Diamond Konex Award as the most important scientist in the last decade in Argentina, 2013
 Lorentz Medal, 2018 
 Albert Einstein Medal, 2018
 St. Albert Award, 2018
 Galileo Galilei Medal, 2019

References

External links
 Maldacena's web page at the Institute
 Maldacena Theme tree

1968 births
Living people
Argentine physicists
Harvard University faculty
Institute for Advanced Study faculty
MacArthur Fellows
National University of Cuyo alumni
People from Buenos Aires
Princeton University alumni
String theorists
Theoretical physicists
Members of the Pontifical Academy of Sciences
Mathematical physicists
Albert Einstein Medal recipients